The 2009 İstanbul Cup was a women's tennis tournament played on outdoor hard courts. It was the fifth edition of the İstanbul Cup, and was part of the WTA International tournaments of the 2009 WTA Tour. It took place in Istanbul, Turkey, from 27 July through 2 August 2009. Vera Dushevina won the singles title.

Entrants

Seeds

 Seeds are based on Rankings on July 20, 2009

Other entrants
The following players received wildcards into the singles main draw

  Pemra Özgen
  İpek Şenoğlu
  Çağla Büyükakçay

The following players received entry from the qualifying draw:
  Anastasiya Yakimova
  Ekaterina Dzehalevich
  Alina Jidkova
  Yuliana Fedak

Finals

Singles

 Vera Dushevina defeated  Lucie Hradecká, 6–0, 6–1
 It was Dushevina's first career title.

Doubles

 Lucie Hradecká /  Renata Voráčová defeated.  Julia Görges /  Patty Schnyder, 2–6, 6–3, 12–10

References

External links
Official website

Istanbul Cup
İstanbul Cup
2009 in Turkish tennis
July 2009 sports events in Turkey
August 2009 sports events in Turkey